La Trinité-des-Monts is a parish municipality in the Canadian province of Quebec, located in the Rimouski-Neigette Regional County Municipality.

Demographics 

Townships
La Roche is a township established on May 5, 1882. It has an overall area of 20,235 hectares and is named for Troilus de Mesqouez.

See also
 Rimouski River
 List of parish municipalities in Quebec

References

External links

Parish municipalities in Quebec
Incorporated places in Bas-Saint-Laurent